Kanavi  is a village in the Gadag district of Karnataka State in India.

Demographics
Per the 2011 Census of India, Kanavi has a total population of 3132; of whom 1623 are male and 1509 female.

Transport
The nearest railway station is in Gadag.

See also
 Lakkundi
 Dambal
 Lakshmeshwar
 Gadag

References

Villages in Gadag district